Pentazenium tetraazidoborate is an extremely unstable chemical compound with the formula N5[B(N3)4]. It is a white solid that violently explodes at room temperature. This compound has a 95.7% nitrogen content which is the highest known of a chemical compound, which exceeds even that of ammonium azide (93.3%) and 1-diazidocarbamoyl-5-azidotetrazole (89.1%).

Production and properties
The production of N5[B(N3)4] requires a multi-step synthesis, first, hydrazoic acid and sodium borohydride is reacted in diethyl ether at -78 °C to produce sodium tetraazidoborate (which decomposes at 76 °C):
NaBH4 + 4HN3 → Na[B(N3)4] + 4H2
The other reactant, pentazenium hexafluoroantimonate, its produced by the reaction of N2F+ and antimony(V) fluoride. Then, two reactants that are produced are mixed at -64 °C under sulfur dioxide:
Na[B(N3)4] + N5SbF6 → N5[B(N3)4] + NaSbF6
to produce the pentazenium tetraazidoborate.
If heated, it decomposes into nitrogen gas and boron triazide; the boron triazide further decomposes into boron nitride and nitrogen. The overall reaction is the following:
N5[B(N3)4] → 8N2 + BN
The compound is extremely sensitive, an attempted Raman spectroscopy of a 500 mg sample of the compound resulted in an explosion.

References

Azido compounds